Pheasants are birds of several genera within the family Phasianidae in the order Galliformes. Although they can be found all over the world in introduced (and captive) populations, the pheasant genera native range is restricted to Eurasia. The classification "pheasant" is paraphyletic, as birds referred to as pheasants are included within both the subfamilies Phasianinae and Pavoninae, and in many cases are more closely related to smaller phasianids, grouse, and turkey (formerly classified in Perdicinae, Tetraoninae, and Meleagridinae) than to other pheasants.

Pheasants are characterised by strong sexual dimorphism, males being highly decorated with bright colours and adornments such as wattles. Males are usually larger than females and have longer tails. Males play no part in rearing the young. 

A pheasant's call or cry can be recognised due to the fact it sounds like a rusty sink or valve being turned.

Pheasants eat mostly seeds, grains, roots, and berries, while in the summer they take advantage of insects, fresh green shoots, spiders, earthworms, and snails.  However, as an introduced species, in the UK they are a threat to endangered native adders.

The best-known is the common pheasant, which is widespread throughout the world, in introduced feral populations and in farm operations. Various other pheasant species are popular in aviaries, such as the golden pheasant (Chrysolophus pictus).

Etymology
According to the Oxford English Dictionary, the word "pheasant" ultimately comes from Phasis, the ancient name of what is now called the Rioni River in Georgia.
It passed from Greek to Latin to French (spelled with an initial "f") then to English, appearing for the first time in English around 1299.

Species in taxonomic order
This list is ordered to show presumed relationships between species.
Subfamily Phasianinae
Tribe Ithaginini
Blood pheasant (genus Ithaginis)
Blood pheasant (I. cruentus)
Tribe Pucrasiini
Koklass (genus Pucrasia)
Koklass pheasant (P. macrolopha)
Tribe Phasianini
Long-tailed pheasants (genus Syrmaticus)
Reeves's pheasant (S. reevesi)
Elliot's pheasant (S. ellioti)
Mrs. Hume's pheasant (S. humiae)
Mikado pheasant (S. mikado)
Copper pheasant (S. soemmerringi)
Ruffed pheasants (genus Chrysolophus)
Golden pheasant (C. pictus)
Lady Amherst's pheasant (C. amherstiae)
Typical pheasants (genus Phasianus)
Green pheasant (P. versicolor)
Common pheasant (P. colchicus)
 Caucasus pheasants, Phasianus colchicus colchicus group
 White-winged pheasants, Phasianus colchicus chrysomelas/principalis group
 Prince of Wales pheasant, Phasianus colchicus principalis
 Mongolian ring-necked pheasants or white-winged ring-necked pheasants, Phasianus colchicus mongolicus group
 Tarim pheasants, Phasianus colchicus tarimensis group
 Chinese ring-necked pheasants, Phasianus colchicus torquatus group
 Taiwan pheasant, Phasianus colchicus formosanus
Cheer pheasant (genus Catreus)
Cheer pheasant (C. wallichi)
Gallopheasants (genus Lophura)
Kalij pheasant (L. leucomelanos)
White-crested kalij pheasant (L. l. hamiltoni)
Nepal kalij pheasant (L. l. leucomelanos)
Black-backed kalij pheasant (L. l. melanota)
Black kalij pheasant (L. l. moffitti)
Black-breasted kalij pheasant (L. l. lathami)
William's kalij pheasant (L. l. williamsi)
Oates' kalij pheasant (L. l. oatesi)
Crawfurd's kalij pheasant (L. l. crawfurdi)
Lineated kalij pheasant (L. l. lineata)
Silver pheasant (L. nycthemera)

Imperial pheasant (L. imperialis)
Edward's pheasant (L. edwardsi)
Vietnamese pheasant (L. hatinhensis)
Swinhoe's pheasant (L. swinhoii)
Hoogerwerf's pheasant (L. hoogerwerfi)
Salvadori's pheasant (L. inornata)
Crestless fireback (L. erythrophthalma)
Malayan crestless fireback (L. e. erythrophthalma)
Bornean crestless fireback (L. e. pyronota)
Crested fireback (L. ignita)
Lesser Bornean crested fireback (L. i. ignita)
Greater Bornean crested fireback (L. i. nobilis)
Vieilott's crested fireback (L. i. rufa)
Delacour's crested fireback (L. i. macartneyi)
Siamese fireback (L. diardi)
Bulwer's pheasant (L. bulweri)
Eared pheasants (genus Crossoptilon)
White eared pheasant (C. crossoptilon)
Tibetan eared pheasant (C. harmani)
Brown eared pheasant (C. mantchuricum)
Blue eared pheasant (C. auritum)
Subfamily Pavoninae
Tribe Pavonini
Crested argus (genus Rheinardia)
Vietnamese crested argus (R. ocellata)
Malayan crested argus (R. nigrescens)
Great argus (genus Argusianus)
Great argus (A. argus)
Tribe Polyprectronini
Peacock-pheasants (genus Polyplectron)
Bronze-tailed peacock-pheasant (P. chalcurum)
Mountain peacock-pheasant (P. inopinatum)
Germain's peacock-pheasant (P. germaini)
Grey peacock-pheasant (P. bicalcaratum
Hainan peacock-pheasant (Polyplectron katsumatae)
Malayan peacock-pheasant (P. malacense)
Bornean peacock-pheasant (P. schleiermacheri)
Palawan peacock-pheasant (P. emphanum)

Previous classifications
Euplocamus and Gennceus are older names more or less corresponding to the current Lophura.
 Euplocamus was used, for example, by Hume and Marshall in their Game Birds of India, Burmah and Ceylon (1879–1881).
 Gennceus, was used, for example, by Frank Finn in Indian Sporting Birds (1915) and Game Birds of India and Asia (1911?).

These old genera were used for:

References

Bibliography
Beebe, William. 1918-22. A Monograph of the Pheasants. 1st edition in 4 volumes: H. F. Witherby, London. Republished as: Pheasants: Their Lives and Homes. 2 vols. 1926. Single volume edition: New York Zoological Society, 1936.)
Green-Armytage, Stephen. 2002. Extraordinary Pheasants.Harry N. Abrams, Inc., New York. Book .
 Madge and McGowan, Pheasants, Partridges and Grouse

External links
Videos of pheasants in the Internet Bird Collection

Phasianidae
Bird common names